Agnar may refer to:

Agnar Helgason (born 1968), Icelandic scientist
Agnar Johannes Barth (1871–1948), Norwegian forester
Agnar Mykle (1915–1944), Norwegian writer
Agnar Sandmo (born 1938), Norwegian economist
Agnarr Geirröðsson, son of King Geirröðr in the Poetic Edda poem Grímnismál
King Agnar, a character in the Disney Frozen franchise
 Chief of the Mangalores in the 1997 movie The Fifth Element

no:Agnar